Magga Peak is a triangular "flatiron" shaped wall of sheer rock forming the end of the northernmost of the Burnside Ridges in Antarctica, the summit being a sharp point. It was photographed by U.S. Navy Operation Highjump in 1947. A first landing from a ship was made on 20 February 1959, by the Australian National Antarctic Research Expeditions (Magga Dan) led by Phillip Law.

References

Mountains of Oates Land